Narayaniyam is a medieval-era Sanskrit text, comprising a summary study in poetic form of the Bhāgavata Purana. It was composed by Melpathur Narayana Bhattathiri, (1560–1666 AD) one of the celebrated Sanskrit poets in Kerala. Even though the Narayaneeyam is believed to be composed as early as 1586 AD, earliest available manuscripts came only after more than 250 years. The Bhagavata Purana is a major Hindu scripture consisting of about 18,000 verses, mainly devoted to the worship of Krishna.

The poem 

The nārāyaṇīyam (pronunciation IPA: [nɑːrɑːjəɳiːjəm]) condenses the Bhagavata Purana into 1034 verses, divided into one hundred dasakam, or cantos. The work occupies a very high place in Sanskrit literature, both because of the intense devotional fervour of the verses, and because of their extraordinary literary merit. The nārāyanīyam is one of the most popular religious texts in Kerala and Tamil Nadu, and devout Hindus often recite it together in festivals and groups.

Nārāyanīyam is the story of Lord Narayana. It is a work consisting of 1035 slokas or verses, divided into 100 dasakams or chapters, each dasakam consisting of approximately 10 slokas. It is a condensed version of Bhagavata Purana, which consists of 18,000 slokas authored by Veda Vyasa. It is said that the work has the blessings of Lord Krishna or Guruvayoorappan, the presiding Deity of Guruvayur.

Narayaneeyam narrates a series of episodes from the Bhagavata Purana, choosing the most pious of the lot. The incarnations of Vishnu are traced with piety, Bhattathiri transforms the episodes into solemn prayers, pouring out his soul in total supplication before the Lord. The final dasaka, Kesadipaada Varnanam, embodies top-to-toe picture of little Krishna in all grace and glory.

Both as a poem and as a devotional hymn, Narayaneeyam occupies a very high place in Sanskrit literature.

Narayaneeyam is the masterpiece of Melpathur and is the most widely read of all his works. The poet depicts the image of Lord Guruvayurappan, in exemplary terms - "Sammohanam Mohanal Kantham Kanthinidhanathopi, Madhuram Madhurya Dhuryadapi, Soundaryotharathopi Sundaratharam"

The "Parayana" of Narayaneeyam is believed to possess the wonderful power of healing afflictions, both mental and physical, of the devotees. The "Nithyaparayana” of Narayaneeyam will enable the devotees to attain " Ayurarogyasoukhyam”.

Narayaneeya Sapthaham ( the recitation of Narayaneeyam and explaining the meaning to the public) is conducted in Guruvayur temple by Devaswom on the Narayaneeya Dinam and by others as offerings. It is done for seven consecutive days from early morning till 6:10 p.m. Narayaneeya Sapthaham has started in Guruvayur in the early 1950s. It takes about 5 hours to read the slokas and about 45 hours for explaining the slokas.

The day on which Narayaneeyam was completed, 28th Vrischikam, is celebrated by the Devaswom as Narayaneeyam day. Discourses and debates on Narayaneeyam written by Melpathur take place. Special functions are held at Melpathur Illapparambu also.

The author
Melpathur Narayana Bhattathirippadu was born about the year 1560 in a village near the temple of Tirunāvāya in Malappuram district, Kerala. He composed the Narayanīyam at the age of 27.

Other monumental works by Bhattathiri include a treatise on Sanskrit Grammar, entitled Prakriyasarvasva, a work similar to the Siddhanta Kaumudi, but written earlier. It is said that Bhaṭṭoji Dīkṣita, the author of the Siddhanta Kaumudi, on hearing about Bhattathiri, set out for Kerala to meet him, but had to return disappointed on hearing on the way that Bhattathiri had died.

Bhattathiri composed many other devotional hymns, as well as a work on Purva-Mimamsa entitled  Manameyodaya, and panegyrics in praise of his royal patrons. It is believed that he lived till the age of 105.malpathur narayanan bhattathiri was a mathematician.

Origin legend of the Narayaniyam
The people of Kerala worship Krishna in His deity form as Guruvayurappan in the temple town of Guruvayur. According to local legends, Bhattathiri had a Guru by the name of Achyuta Pisharadi, who fell victim to a severe attack of paralysis, and suffered unbearable pain. Bhattathiri desired to find a cure for his master and fervently prayed for the disease to be transferred to himself, freeing his Guru from suffering. According to the legend, Lord Krishna granted Bhattathiri his wish, and he soon became crippled.

Once, when Bhattathiri, unable to move, was carried into the Guruvayur temple, he met Thunchath Ezhuthachan, an eminent Malayalam poet of the time. Ezhuthachan advised Bhattathiri that he could be cured if he "began his treatment with fish". The disciples of Bhattathiri who heard this were shocked because Bhattathiri was a devout Brahmin and therefore a vegetarian who would consider it sinful to eat fish. Bhattathiri however understood what Ezhuthachan really meant - that he would be cured if he could compose a hymn glorifying the incarnations of Lord Krishna beginning with the fish incarnation, known as Matsya.

Accordingly, he started composing the Narayaniyam. It is said that he would recite one dasakam, consisting of ten verses, every day. The local legend says that on the hundredth day he had a vision of the Lord, and rendered a graphic description of this form, after which he was immediately cured of his disease.

The Cakorasandesa, which was earlier than Narayaneeyam, also refers to rheumatic patients going to the Guruvayur temple. Worship in the Guruvayur temple is considered to be sure remedy for all diseases.

Narayaneeya Sahasranama
Narayaneeya Sahasranama is a condensed form of Narayaneeyam consisting of 1000 names of Vishnu. It is carefully created collections, of all the namas (names) of Vishnu's Avataras, that appear sequentially and chapter-wise in the Narayaneeyam. It was composed by Ayyappan Kariyat, an Ayurveda vaidya.

References

External links
Full Text in Sanskrit Wikisource

Hindu texts
Sanskrit texts
Vaishnavism

Nārāyanīyam in Sanskrit with English and Hindi translations